The 1896 Gloucester smallpox epidemic affected more than 2,000 people in Gloucester between 5 January and 27 July 1896. A large number of the town's population were not vaccinated.

On 13 August 1896, the Royal Commission on Vaccination's report on the epidemic was published by the Royal College of Surgeons of England.

Background
In Britain, smallpox vaccination became compulsory in the 1850s. In Gloucester, a smallpox outbreak occurred in the mid-1870s. However, the 1890s also saw anti-vaccination beliefs.

Cases
President of the Local Government Board Thomas Russell stated in 1896 that, between 4 January and 25 July 1896, the number of cases of smallpox in Gloucester totalled 2,008. A large number of the town's population were not vaccinated.

Ethel Cromwell
Ethel Cromwell was around 14 years old when her photograph was taken in a hospital in Gloucester, following admission with smallpox. She was not vaccinated, but recovered.

Response
An isolation hospital, the Stroud Road hospital was built in response.

One reaction was that it led to prejudice against Gloucesterians.

On 13 August 1896, the Royal College of Surgeons of England published a report by the Royal Commission on Vaccination, whose members included Lord Herschell and Sir James Paget.

A subsequent outbreak of smallpox occurred in 1923.

See also
 Walter Hadwen

References

Further reading 
 The smallpox epidemic in Gloucester in 1895-6, and the water cure. Pickering, J. (1896)
 Gloucester epidemic of small-pox, 1895-6 : report of the committee appointed by the Board of Guardians to organise and carry out the general vaccination of the city and district. Gloucester (England) Royal College of Surgeons of England (1896)
 What the press has said about the Gloucester epidemic and the report of the Royal Commission on Vaccination Royal College of Surgeons of England (1896)
 Does vaccination prevent smallpox? Does vaccination prevent smallpox? : a lesson taught from the Gloucester epidemic. Drysdale, Charles R., London Vegetarian Society (1896)
 Smallpox at Gloucester: A Reply to Dr. Coupland’s Report, 1902. Reprinted from "The Reformer," National Anti-Vaccination League: Gloucester.

External links 
 

Smallpox epidemics
1896 in England
History of Gloucester